The final tournament of the 1992 King Fahd Cup began on 15 October and concluded on 20 October 1992 with the final at the King Fahd II Stadium, Riyadh. A third-place match was included and played between the two losing teams of the semi-finals.

In the knockout stage (including the final), if a match was level at the end of 90 minutes, extra time of two periods (15 minutes each) would be played. If the score was still level after extra time, the match would be decided by a penalty shoot-out.

Bracket

Semi-finals

United States v Saudi Arabia

Argentina v Ivory Coast

Third place match

Final

The 1992 King Fahd Cup Final was held at King Fahd II Stadium, Riyadh, Saudi Arabia on 20 October 1992. The match was contested by Argentina and the hosts, Saudi Arabia. Argentina won their first King Fahd Cup/Confederations Cup title.

References

External links
 (archived)

Knockout
King Fahd Cup
King Fahd Cup
   
King Fahd Cup
October 1992 events in Asia